The UN Campus in Bonn, Germany, is seat to 18 organizations of the United Nations. It was opened in July 2006 by then-Secretary-General Kofi Annan and then-Chancellor of Germany Angela Merkel and expanded in July 2013.

The UN Campus is owned by the Institute for Federal Real Estate and used rent-free by the United Nations.

The 2017 United Nations Climate Change Conference (COP 23) was held on 6–17 November 2017 there and in World Conference Center Bonn (WCCB), near the UNFCCC secretariat, for the Republic of Fiji.

Constituent agencies

Agencies/offices 
The following United Nations entities are based, or have offices, at the campus in Bonn:

 Intergovernmental Science-Policy Platform on Biodiversity and Ecosystem Services
 SDG Action Campaign
 United Nations Education, Scientific and Cultural Organization 
 International Centre for Technical and Vocational Education and Training
 United Nations Global Center for Human Resources Services 
 United Nations Industrial Development Organization 
 Investment and Technology Promotion Office Germany
 United Nations Office for Disaster Risk Reduction
 United Nations Office for Outer Space Affairs 
 United Nations Platform for Space-based Information for Disaster Management and Emergency Response 
 United Nations Regional Information Centre
 Liaison office in Germany
 United Nations System Staff College 
 Knowledge Centre for Sustainable Development
 United Nations University 
 Institute for Environment and Human Security
 Vice Rectorate in Europe
 Vice Rectorate in Europe, Sustainable Cycles Programme
 United Nations Volunteers
 World Health Organization
 European Centre for Environment and Health

Secretariats 
The following all have their secretariat offices based at the Bonn campus:
 Agreement on the Conservation of African-Eurasian Migratory Waterbirds
 Agreement on the Conservation of Small Cetaceans of the Baltic, North East Atlantic, Irish and North Seas
 Agreement on the Conservation of Populations of European Bats
 Convention on the Conservation of Migratory Species of Wild Animals
 United Nations Convention to Combat Desertification
 United Nations Framework Convention on Climate Change

References

External links 

City of Bonn - Info on UN Bonn

Bonn
Buildings and structures in Bonn
Germany and the United Nations
2006 establishments in Germany